Machlotica porphyrospila is a species of sedge moth in the genus Machlotica. It was described by Edward Meyrick in 1927. It is found in Peru.

References

Moths described in 1927
Glyphipterigidae
Moths of South America